Absar (also Romanized as Ābṣār) is a village in Bala Taleqan Rural District, in the Central District of Taleqan County, Alborz Province, Iran. At the 2006 census, its population was 32, in 8 families.

References 

Populated places in Taleqan County